Gifford Wells Shaw (February 5, 1898 – April 7, 1963) was an American football coach. He served as the head football coach at Presbyterian College in Clinton, South Carolina in 1918, where he was enrolled as a student.

Head coaching record

References

External links
 

1898 births
1963 deaths
Presbyterian Blue Hose football coaches
People from Sumter, South Carolina